Austin M. Harrier (April 7, 1912 – September 24, 2000) was a Republican member of the Pennsylvania House of Representatives.

References

Republican Party members of the Pennsylvania House of Representatives
2000 deaths
1912 births
20th-century American politicians